Chrysochamela is a genus of flowering plants belonging to the family Brassicaceae.

Its native range is Turkey to Syria.

Species:

Chrysochamela draboides 
Chrysochamela elliptica 
Chrysochamela noeana 
Chrysochamela velutina

References

Brassicaceae
Brassicaceae genera
Botany stubs